Dan Larkin is an Irish former rugby union player.

Career
Larkin played in the Munster team that lost 31–9 to New Zealand in 1989, but was on the winning side when Munster beat the then-world champions Australia in 1992. Larkin was a veteran of the team by the time the Heineken Cup was formed in 1995, featuring in both of the provinces first fixtures in the competition.

He won a Munster Schools Rugby Senior Cup in 1983 with Crescent College, the schools first senior cup in twenty years, and went on to represent Limerick club Garryowen, winning All-Ireland League titles in 1992 and 1994. He also represented Dublin club Bective Rangers.

References

External links
Munster Profile

Living people
People educated at Crescent College
Irish rugby union players
Garryowen Football Club players
Bective Rangers players
Munster Rugby players
Rugby union centres
Rugby union fly-halves
Year of birth missing (living people)